Orgram Chatuspalli High Madrasah is a model madrasah in Orgram village, Burdwan district, in the Indian state of West Bengal. It is divided into secondary, higher secondary, rabindra open school, and vocational training. It enrolls students from class V to Higher secondary(+2). It has over 1,339 students and 41 teachers in secondary and higher secondary areas.

References

Madrasas in West Bengal
High schools and secondary schools in West Bengal
Schools in Bardhaman
Educational institutions established in 1975
1975 establishments in West Bengal